The Entrance  may refer to:

 The Entrance (film)
 The Entrance, New South Wales
 Electoral district of The Entrance, the electoral district in the Legislative Assembly which encompasses the above-mentioned town

 See also
 Entrance (disambiguation)